The British Rail Class 309 "Clacton Express" electric multiple units (EMUs) were built by British Rail (BR) York Carriage Works from 1962–1963. They were initially classified as Class AM9 before the introduction of TOPS. These units were the first express 25 kV alternating current (AC) units to be built by British Rail and were their first EMUs capable of 100 mph.

Description and design
Twenty-four units were built in three different configurations:
601–608 – Two-car units (309/1)
611–618 – Four-car units containing a griddle car (309/2)
621–627 – Four-car units (309/3)
Each unit had identical electrical equipment. The original concept called for increasing the power-to-weight ratio when strengthening trains from eight to ten cars in peak periods using the 2-car units, in order to make the peak timetable more resilient.

Due to problems that had been encountered with the BR1 bogie design then current for Mk1 loco-hauled coaches, the Class 309s were built with Commonwealth bogies, much heavier than the more modern design, but more robust. The exception to this is vehicle E19608 which was originally a BR Class 123 Buffet Vehicle No. W59831. This was converted to a 309 griddle car but retained its B4 bogies, becoming the only vehicle in the class with this type. This vehicle also had 36 seats in the Buffet area compared to 24 in the other units.

More unusual was the front end design, incorporating the drivers cab but retaining passenger access between units via a pullman gangway, particularly necessary to allow access to the griddle car from all coaches. The design was based on the front end of the Class 303 but with the gangway placed centrally and also incorporating a headcode box. Also notable was the curved wrap-around glass on the cab windows, but these proved expensive to replace and later an additional pillar was inserted so that flat glass could be used. The units were originally class AM9 (AC Multiple Unit) pre-TOPS, and were painted in the BR standard coaching stock maroon livery lined black & yellow, with the driving end gangway doors painted warning panel yellow.

Units 605-608 were expanded to 4 coaches in 1973 by the addition of a Corridor Second (SK) and a Corridor Composite (CK) and reclassified 309/4. In 1981 units 601-608 were again altered so that the formation became MBS-TC-DMS, and numbers 605-608 were reclassified back to 309/1.

Operations
When built, units were originally planned to be used on the Original Proposed East Coast Main Line Electrification Scheme, however, when this was abandoned the units were deployed on Great Eastern Main Line (GEML) express services from London Liverpool Street to Clacton-on-Sea and Walton-on-the-Naze (also marketed as the Sunshine Coast Line) which is what gained them the class nickname Clacton Express. Trains would be formed of three units in a ten-car formation (i.e. one two car unit, and two four car units). The train would divide at Thorpe-le-Soken, with one of the 4-cars units used on the Walton section, and the remaining six cars continuing to Clacton. The Clacton portion usually included the griddle car unit, and was always the second to leave Thorpe-le-Soken, being the rear (London end) portion of the coastbound train. The choice of building units with only two coaches may seem unusual, but these were intended only for use in strengthening pairs of four coach units at peak times to produce a ten coach train, and with this in mind they only had second class accommodation.

The Class 309 units were considerably more powerful than the Britannia pacifics that they replaced with a typical 10-coach formation (2 x 4-car units plus 1 x 2-car unit) producing 3,384 hp for  tare. However, from 1971 it was found that additional capacity was required for the evening peak and the 17.40 departure from Liverpool Street station was increased to 12 coaches by the addition of a second 2-car unit bringing the power output up to 4,512 hp from a train of  tare.

In the 1970s many of the units were reformed. The two-car units were augmented to four-car units.
In 1973-74 units 605-608 with the addition of TSK with TCK converted former Mk1 SK and CK coaches which formed in to 4 car sets. 
In 1978 units 601-604 with the addition of TCK and TSOL converted former Mk1 CK and TSO coaches which formed in to 4 car sets.
In the early 1980s units 611-618 had the griddle cars were taken out of use and replaced by TSOL from 601-604 and TSK from 605-608. 
601-608 were augmented to 3-car units until refurbishment work in 1985-86 
In 1986-87 refurbishment work required the addition of 8 Mk1 TSO coaches to be converted to TSO trailers for units 611-618 with the borrowed TSOL and TSK trailers all being converted to TSOL trailers and reformed back into 601-608.

The entire fleet was refurbished in the period 1985–1987, with the single-glazed wooden framed windows replaced by aluminium-framed double-glazed units with hopper ventilators. Another change was 2 + 2 seating in open saloons replacing the second class compartments, this change producing an increase in seating capacity.

The first refurbished units outshopped were painted in the bold new London and SouthEastern "Jaffa Cake" livery. However, this was soon superseded by the equally bold Network SouthEast livery, which was introduced in 1986. Coinciding with the refurbishment work, in 1985 electrification spread north from Colchester to Ipswich, and later to Harwich and Norwich. This meant the Class 309 units were soon introduced on fast trains to Ipswich and Harwich.

In 1989, new Class 321/3 units were introduced onto GEML services partially replacing both class 309 and Class 312 diagrams. The "Clacton Express" units however continued until May 1992 in main service and then a reduced fleet operated a few rush hour services until January 1994. The last units were withdrawn on 22 January 1994, despite their recent and expensive refurbishment. After working a final railtour (15 January 1994) and the week of normal services a final Saturday diagram was run with 309626/613/616 ending on the 1800 Liverpool Street - Clacton. However, not all units were immediately scrapped, and seven were retained for possible reuse around Manchester on suburban trains. These units were stored at Blackpool.

In 1994, North West Regional Railways (NWRR) acquired the seven redundant units stored at Blackpool. The units, nos. 309613/616/617/624/626/627, were quickly put to use on suburban passenger services from Manchester Piccadilly to Crewe and Stoke-on-Trent. Six of the units were repainted in NWRR blue livery with a green stripe. The seventh, no. 309624, was repainted in a special blue livery to commemorate the opening a new railway line to Manchester International Airport in 1996. Upon privatisation, the units passed to the North Western Trains (NWT) franchise. This was later renamed First North Western (FNW) following FirstGroup taking 100% ownership of Great Western Holdings.

By the late 1990s, the seven units saw continued use around Manchester. They also saw some use on longer distance services, with one booked daily Manchester Piccadilly-Birmingham International service and return. On occasion, units were used on NWT's Manchester-London Euston service, deputising for a non-available Class 322 unit. At one point, it was planned to use the units on a new - stopping service, but this did not happen. However, the end was in sight, because as part of their franchise commitment, FNW had to replace their slam-door rolling stock, including the Class 309 units. New Class 175 diesel multiple units were introduced in 2000, and FNW discontinued its Manchester-Euston service. This meant that the "Clacton Express" units were surplus to requirements. As a farewell gesture, three units were used on a final railtour from Manchester to their old haunt of  via London Liverpool Street. Following this tour, all seven units were withdrawn in late 2000, and sent for storage at MoD Pig's Bay near Shoeburyness. Two of the units later saw further use in departmental service, whilst the remaining five were scrapped in 2004.

Further use
Following withdrawal from normal service, three units were transferred to Eastleigh works: numbers 616, 617 and 624. In 2001, two of these units were converted to Class 960 departmental units for cab-signalling tests at the Old Dalby test track. They were reduced in length to 3 cars and painted in a blue and white livery. The new units' designations were 960101 (ex-309616), named West Coast Flyer, and 960102 (ex-309624), named New Dalby. They were withdrawn in 2004, following completion of the tests and were stored at MoD Pig's Bay, near Shoeburyness, Essex, until early 2009 when they entered preservation. The third unit, 617, was used as a spares donor and sat derelict at Eastleigh until it was scrapped in August 2004.

Finally, one vehicle from 309623 survives; its TSO was purchased by West Coast Railways in 2003 for eventual spares use. It has, however, remained unrestored at Carnforth MPD, still in its Regional Railways livery

Preservation
Several attempts since their original withdrawal from the London to Clacton route in 1994 have been made to preserve a class 309 by a number of organisations that have never come to much more than attempts. Preservation actions have included trying to originally preserve 309605 and 309606 at Ilford in spring 1994, an attempt around their completion of First North Western services to preserve a unit (309623), then and at least one other time all not coming to any fruition. However, once no further work was found for them in test train use, units 309616 and 309624 were successfully preserved by AMPSRail Limited in 2009, and went to the Electric Railway Museum, Warwickshire. However, when this was forced to close in 2018, the sale of 624 was used to fund transport costs for 616, and the two sets were split up, both going to different homes.

616, still in the care of AMPSRail, Ended up at the Tanat Valley Light Railway in Oswestry. Here it has remained as a static exhibit with the interior now used as a Cafe and tea room, titled "The Clacton Cafe"

624 was sold to the Lavender Line and arrived in 2018. Minor conservation work was carried out but due to changing priorities at the railway the set was put up for sale in 2021. In March 2022 the Clacton Express Preservation Group purchased the set and have started a restoration to working order. It is to remain at the Lavender line.

References

Citations

Sources

Further reading

External links

Class 309 History
Electric Railway Museum Limited - Owners of the preserved units From 2009-2018

309
Train-related introductions in 1962
25 kV AC multiple units